The 1900 Rhode Island gubernatorial election was held on April 4, 1900. Republican nominee William Gregory defeated Democratic nominee Nathan W. Littlefield with 54.33% of the vote.

General election

Candidates
Major party candidates
William Gregory, Republican
Nathan W. Littlefield, Democratic

Other candidates
James P. Reid, Socialist Labor
Henry B. Metcalf, Prohibition

Results

References

1900
Rhode Island
Gubernatorial